Frank Moser may refer to:
Frank Moser (artist) (1886–1964), American artist, illustrator and film director
Frank Moser (tennis) (born 1976), German tennis player